Władysław Stefan Komar (11 April 1940 – 17 August 1998) was a Polish shot putter, actor and cabaretist. Competing in three Summer Olympics between 1964 and 1972, he won the gold medal at the Munich Games in 1972 with a throw of 21.18 metres. His nickname was "King Kong" Komar as attributed to a Sports Illustrated article.

His personal bests in the shot put were 21.19 metres outdoors (Warsaw 1974) and 20.32 metres indoors (Grenoble 1972), both being national records during his career.

Early life
Władysław Komar was born in Kaunas, Lithuania on 11 April 1940 to Władysław Komar-Zabożyński and Wanda Jasińska. As a Polish noble family they owned a mansion in Rogówek (Lithuanian: Raguvėlė). Both of his parents were athletes – father competed for Lithuania as Vladas Komaras at the 1934 European Athletics Championships in the high jump and 110 metres hurdles, mother was a shot putter, who set a national record in the early 1930s. During World War Two the family moved to Gulbiny (Lithuanian: Didieji Gulbinai). His father, who during war helped the Polish anti-German resistance movement, the Home Army, was murdered in 1944 in Glitiškės by a group of Ypatingasis būrys militia.
After the entrance of the Red Army in 1945 young Wladysław escaped with his mother and older sister to Warsaw as the mother feared they might get sent to Syberia by the Soviets like many former land owners. They first travelled through Białystok to Warsaw before his being placed in an orphanage near Poznań, in Western Poland. In 1953, after graduating from primary school by the orphanage, his mother brought him to live with her in Warsaw.

Boxing career
The first sport that Komar took up was amateur boxing, which he started practising in 1955 and competed in the heavyweight category. He went as far as representing his country at the under-20 level. His last fight was in a junior team match against Italy in 1959 when he was knocked out by Giorgio Masteghin in the first round. After that he got convinced to switch to athletics although initially he also practised rugby and handball.

Athletics career
At the beginning of his athletics career he also competed in the high jump and decathlon. He even set a Polish record in the latter in 1963. Komar's major championships debut came at the 1962 European Championships in Belgrade where he finished fourth behind compatriot Alfred Sosgórnik. In February next year he threw 18.60 metres, his first national record. In June 1964, he improved the national record to 19.50 metres, just 6 centimetres shy of the European record. This result made him one of the favourites for the October Olympic Games held in Tokyo, however, he only managed ninth place with 18.20 metres. In 1966 he set the Polish indoor record of 19.20 metres and later that year the outdoor record of 19.61. Afterwards he competed at his second European Championships in Budapest where he managed the bronze.

At his third Olympic Games, in Munich, he won the shot put competition throwing 21.18 metres, just one centimetre further than the American George Woods and four ahead of East Germans, Briesenick and Gies.

After retirement
Komar later became an actor, appearing in more than ten films, including Kazimierz Wielki (1976), Soviet Boris Godunov (1986), Roman Polanski's Pirates (1986), as well as Magnat (1987) and Kiler (1997).

He took part in the professional wrestling show, organised by a former Polish Olympic wrestler, Andrzej Supron, which toured the Soviet Union in 1989 and 1990.

Death
He died on 17 August 1998 in a car crash coming back from an athletics meeting in Międzyzdroje together with another Olympic gold medallist, pole vaulter Tadeusz Ślusarski. The car they hit was driven by another athlete, former sprinter, Jarosław Marzec, who died several days later. A memorial athletics meeting in their name is held every year in Międzyzdroje.

Personal life
Władysław Komar was married twice. His first wife, Małgorzata Spychalska (b. 1942), was a daughter of Marian Spychalski, a prominent Polish communist politician. They divorced in 1973.
With his second wife Maria (1950–2008), a former volley ball player, he had one son Mikołaj (b. 1977) who went on to become a photographer.

Competition record

Filmography
Kazimierz Wielki (1975) as Władzio
Skradziona kolekcja (1979) as Driver
Pirates (1986) as Jesus
Boris Godunov (1986) as Sobansky
Przyłbice i kaptury (1986, TV series) as Dzieweczka
Magnat (1987) as Guide in the palace
Opowieść Harleya (1988) as Man working for Witek
Sonata marymoncka (1988) as Zieliński
W klatce (1988) as Landlady's husband
And the Violins Stopped Playing (1988) as Dombrowski
La Treizième voiture (1993) as Alexander
Blood of the Innocent (1994) as Thug
Kiler (1997) as Uszat
Prostytutki (1998) as Szogun, Bodyguard at Gejsza

References

External links

1940 births
1998 deaths
Polish male shot putters
Olympic athletes of Poland
Polish male boxers
Athletes (track and field) at the 1964 Summer Olympics
Athletes (track and field) at the 1968 Summer Olympics
Athletes (track and field) at the 1972 Summer Olympics
Olympic gold medalists for Poland
Road incident deaths in Poland
Sportspeople from Kaunas
European Athletics Championships medalists
20th-century Polish male actors
Medalists at the 1972 Summer Olympics
Olympic gold medalists in athletics (track and field)
Polish cabaret performers
Lechia Gdańsk athletes
Lechia Gdańsk rugby players